The second season of the American television sitcom The Nanny aired on CBS from September 12, 1994, to May 22, 1995. The series was created by actress Fran Drescher and her-then husband Peter Marc Jacobson, and developed by Prudence Fraser and Robert Sternin. Produced by Sternin and Fraser Ink Inc. and TriStar Television, the series features Drescher, Jacobson, Fraser, Sternin, Caryn Lucas and Diane Wilk as executive producers.

Based on an idea inspired by Drescher's visit with a friend and The Sound of Music, the season revolves around Fran Fine, a Jewish woman from Flushing, Queens, New York, who is hired by a wealthy Broadway producer to be the nanny to his three children. Drescher stars as the titular character, Charles Shaughnessy as British-born producer Maxwell Sheffield, and the children – Maggie, Brighton and Grace – portrayed by Nicholle Tom, Benjamin Salisbury, and Madeline Zima. The series also features Daniel Davis as Niles, the family butler, and Lauren Lane as C.C. Babcock, Maxwell's associate in his production company who is smitten with him. Several recurring characters also played a role in the sitcom's plotlines, many of whom were related to Fran.

Cast and characters

Main
 Fran Drescher as Fran Fine
 Charles Shaughnessy as Maxwell Sheffield
 Daniel Davis as Niles
 Lauren Lane as Chastity Claire "C.C" Babcock
 Nicholle Tom as Maggie Sheffield
 Benjamin Salisbury as Brighton Sheffield
 Madeline Zima as Grace Sheffield

Recurring
 Renée Taylor as Sylvia Fine
 Rachel Chagall as Val Toriello
 Ann Morgan Guilbert as Yetta Rosenberg

Special guest stars
 Richard Kind as Jeffrey Needleman
 Efrem Zimbalist Jr. as Theodore Timmons
 Ben Vereen as himself
 Wallace Shawn as Charles Haste
 Corbin Bernsen as Glen Mitchell
 Bob Barker as himself
 Sally Jessy Raphael as herself
 Erik Estrada as himself
 Steve Lawrence as himself
 Eydie Gormé as herself
 George Murdock as Dakota Williams
 Roger Clinton Jr. as himself
 Shari Lewis as herself
 Christina Pickles as Nurse
 Billy Ray Cyrus as himself
 Tyne Daly as Mona

Guest stars
 Tracy Kolis as Leslie
 Richard Kind as Jeffrey Needleman
 Bonnie Morgan as Brooke
 Ralph Manza as Saul
 Judith Hoag as Kathy Marie O'Malley / Katherine Porter
 Nancy Linari as Mrs. Livingston
 Nancy Lenehan as Russian Woman
 Dayton Callie as The Sergeant
 Richard Portnow as Phillipe
 Mort Drescher as Uncle Stanley
 Christopher Brand as Cousin Irving
 Zack Norman as Uncle Jack
 Nancy Frangione as Cousin Marsha
 Morgan Brittany as Judy Silverman
 Michael Winters as Doug Emerson
 Christopher Rich as Kurt Jacobs
 Jake Richardson as Willie
 Ellen Ratner as Nadine Cooperman
 Ron Orbach as Barry Cooperman
 Tracy Nelson as Mary Ruth
 Patrick Cassidy as Mr. Anthony
 Edward Hibbert as Claude
 J. D. Daniels as Jack Walker / Mimo
 Lauren Tom as Kim

Episodes

References

External links
 

1994 American television seasons
1995 American television seasons
The Nanny